Vincent Bezecourt (born 10 June 1993) is a French footballer who plays as an midfielder for Singapore Premier League Club Geylang International.

Career

Early career
Bezecourt began his football career in France with Jeunesse Villenavaise and made his debut with the first team during the 2012 season in Championnat de France amateur. In two season with the first team, he appeared in 52 league matches scoring 9 goals. In 2014, he went to the United States to play College soccer for St. Francis Brooklyn under head coach Tom Giovatto. In his first year, Bezecourt helped lead St. Francis Brooklyn to an NEC Championship and to an NCAA Tournament appearance. He was also named as a Second Team All-NEC player. In his two seasons with the Terriers, Bezecourt appeared in 39 matches scoring 10 goals and recording 9 assists. Following his senior season he was named a Third Team All-American by the National Soccer Coaches Association of America and a First Team All-NEC player.

Professional career
While at St. Francis, during the 2015 season, Bezecourt played with the Brooklyn Italians of the National Premier Soccer League under head coach Dominic Casciato. After graduation from  St. Francis College, Bezecourt trained with the New York Red Bulls during the preseason and subsequently signed a professional contract with the New York Red Bulls II of the United Soccer League on 18 March 2016. On 11 August 2017, it was announced that the New York Red Bulls signed Bezecourt to an MLS contract. At the time of his signing, he had scored 12 goals and recorded 10 assists in the regular season, along with 2 goals and 4 assists in the 2016 USL playoffs en route to the team's first USL Championship.

2016
In his first professional season, Bezecourt appeared in 22 matches, recording 8 goals and 6 assists en route to winning the 2016 USL Championship as a starting midfielder for the New York Red Bulls II. His 8 goals and 6 assists were second and third most on the team, respectively.

A week after signing on with New York Red Bulls II, Bezecourt featured in his first professional match with the club appearing as a second-half substitute in a 2–2 draw against Toronto FC II. During the second game of the season, Bezecourt suffered a leg injury that sidelined him for 2–3 months. On 2 August 2016 Bezecourt came off the bench to score his first two goals for the New York Red Bulls II in a 5–0 rout over Harrisburg City Islanders. On 7 September  2016, he again scored two goals against the Harrisburg City Islanders, this time to help win the 2016 USL Regular Season Championship for the Red Bulls II. As a result of his performance (2 goals and 1 assist), Bezecourt was named USLSoccer.com Man of the Match. Later that week, he scored another goal in the 89th minute against the Rochester Rhinos to tie the game. Due to both performances Bezecourt was selected to the USL Team of the Week. In the last game of the regular season against the Charleston Battery, Bezecourt scored on a free kick in the 38th minute for his 6th goal of the season. He was also named USLSoccer.com Man of the Match for the second time this season.

USL playoffs
Bezecourt scored two goals and recorded four assists, as he helped NY Red Bulls II win the 2016 USL Championship. On 2 October 2016, Bezecourt scored a goal and assisted on two others to help New York Red Bulls II advance to the Eastern Conference Semifinals of the 2016 USL Playoffs in a 4–0 victory over Orlando City B. In the two games leading to the USL Championship, Bezecourt recorded three assists and scored on a penalty shoot-out in overtime against Louisville City FC to help win the game. In the Championship game against the Swope Park Rangers, Bezecourt scored a goal in the 92 minute to put the finishing touch on a 5–1 victory.

2017
Bezecourt made 24 appearances with the NY Red Bulls II and 3 appearances with the major league club; NY Red Bulls. Half-way through the USL season, Bezecourt was given an MLS contract and loaned to NY Red Bulls II. He finished the USL regular season with 6 goals and 11 assists. His 11 assists, led the team and the USL Eastern Conference, and was second overall in the USL. Bezecourt was also tied for leader on the team, in being named to the USL team of the Week three times. At the end of the season, he was named to the 2017 USL All-League Second Team.

On 21 November 2016 it was announced that the New York Red Bulls II would exercise their option on the contract of Bezecourt. On 25 March 2017, Bezecourt helped New York to a 3–3 draw with Pittsburgh Riverhounds, scoring two goals in the opening match of the season. Bezecourt went on to be named to the USL Team of the Week three times for weeks 1, 4, and 11. He was also named to the USL Bench Players of the Week, for weeks 2 and 18.

On 12 July 2017 Bezecourt was promoted to the New York Red Bulls for a 13 July match against the New England Revolution as part of the Lamar Hunt U.S. Open Cup Quarterfinals, as a consequence he missed the Red Bulls II game against Harrisburg City Islanders. Bezecourt was on the senior squad's bench for the match, but did not play against the Revolution. He was back in action with Red Bulls II for the 15 July match against Charlotte Independence, a losing effort that saw Bezecourt notch his league leading eighth assist of the season. Bezecourt, then scored the only goal in a win against Toronto FC II, snapping a three-game losing streak, before missing two games due to injury.

On 11 August 2017, it was announced that the New York Red Bulls signed Bezecourt to an MLS contract. At the time of the signing, Bezecourt had 19 appearances with Red Bulls II, scored six goals and was leading the league with eight assists and 45 chances created. On 18 August 2017, Bezecourt made his first appearance for NY Red Bulls as a starting central midfielder against the Portland Timbers in a 0–2 losing effort. Bezecourt was then sent back to NY Red Bulls II.

Bezecourt's next appearance with NYRB II was against Toronto FC II on 9 September 2017, a 2–1 victory. He made 4 starts, recording 2 assists and against the Pittsburgh Riverhounds on 30 September Bezecourt through a corner kick forced an own goal. The NY Red Bulls II went 2–2 in those games and qualified for the USL Cup, Bezecourt was then sent to the major league club for his second stint.

On 7 October 2017, Bezecourt was a substitute for Bradley Wright-Phillips in the 80th minute against the Vancouver White Caps, a 3–0 victory for the NY Red Bulls. It was his second MLS appearance.

On 14 October 2017, Bezecourt started against the Rochester Rhinos in 1-2 losing effort. Bezecourt recorded an assist in the NY Red Bulls II only goal of the game, it was his 11th assist of the year, which tied for second-most in the USL.

On 22 October 2017, Bezecourt made his second MLS start and third appearance in the final game of the season for the NY Red Bulls against D.C. United. Because of the start, Bezecourt did not participate in the Red Bulls II USL cup pursuit.

MLS Cup Playoffs
Bezecourt made his first playoff appearance as a substitute for Damien Perrinelle in the 82nd minute against Toronto FC.

2018
On December 22, 2017, it was announced that Bezecourt was retained by NY Red Bulls. On 10 March 2018 he started in the Red Bulls' MLS season opener against Portland Timbers recording two assists in the 4–0 win. On June 6, 2018, Bezecourt opened the scoring in New York's 4-0 derby win over New York City FC in the fourth round of the 2018 Lamar Hunt U.S. Open Cup.

2020
In January 2020, Bezecourt signed with Miami FC of the USL Championship.

2021
On 9 March 2021, Bezecourt signed for Armenian Premier League club Alashkert.

On 19 December 2021, Bezecourt signed for Geylang International of the Singapore Premier League.

International career
Before playing at St. Francis College, Bezecourt won a gold medal with France at the 2013 Summer Universiade tournament in Russia.

Career statistics

Club

Honors

Club
New York Red Bulls II
USL Cup (1): 2016 USL Cup Champions 
USL (1): 2016 Regular Season Champions

New York Red Bulls
MLS Supporters' Shield (1): 2018

Alashkert
Armenian Premier League (1): 2020–21

References

External links

1993 births
Living people
Association football midfielders
Expatriate soccer players in the United States
French expatriate footballers
French expatriate sportspeople in the United States
French footballers
Major League Soccer players
New York Red Bulls II players
New York Red Bulls players
Sportspeople from Landes (department)
St. Francis Brooklyn Terriers men's soccer players
USL Championship players
Universiade gold medalists for France
Universiade medalists in football
Miami FC players
Medalists at the 2013 Summer Universiade
Footballers from Nouvelle-Aquitaine
Expatriate footballers in Armenia
French expatriate sportspeople in Armenia
French expatriate sportspeople in Singapore
Expatriate footballers in Singapore